Frankly Speaking is an album by saxophonists Frank Foster and Frank Wess which was recorded in 1984 and released on the Concord Jazz label the following year.

Reception

The AllMusic review by Scott Yanow said "Using the same personnel as the previous year's Two for the Blues, this set gets the slight edge and is an excellent introduction to the playing of the two Count Basie saxophonists. ... Recommended".

Track listing
All compositions by Frank Foster except where noted
 "An' All Such Stuff as 'Dat" – 6:32
 "The Summer Knows" (Michel Legrand, Alan Bergman, Marilyn Bergman) – 6:47	
 "When Did You Leave Heaven?" (Richard A. Whiting, Walter Bullock) – 7:12
 "Up and Coming" (Frank Wess) – 4:43
 "One Morning in May" (Hoagy Carmichael, Mitchell Parish) – 5:01
 "Two Franks" (Neal Hefti) – 3:09
 "This Is All I Ask" (Gordon Jenkins) – 10:22
 "Blues Backstage" – 5:47

Personnel
Frank Foster – soprano saxophone, tenor saxophone
Frank Wess – tenor saxophone, flute
Kenny Barron – piano
Rufus Reid – double bass
Marvin "Smitty" Smith – drums

References

Concord Records albums
Frank Wess albums
Frank Foster (musician) albums
1985 albums